Lincoln Township is a township in Sedgwick County, Kansas, United States. As of the 2000 United States Census, it had a population of 473.

Lincoln Township is a rural community where the majority of residents own their homes, fostering a strong sense of community. The township is known for its conservative values and offers a peaceful and quiet lifestyle away from the bustle of city life. The public schools in Lincoln Township have a reputation for being above average, providing excellent educational opportunities for children in the area.

References

Townships in Sedgwick County, Kansas
Townships in Kansas